The Women's 100 metres T11 event at the 2016 Summer Paralympics took place at the Estádio Olímpico João Havelange between 8 and 9 September. It featured 16 athletes from 11 countries.

The event was won by Great Britain's Libby Clegg, guided by Chris Clarke. Having run a world record for the classification in the semi-final, Clegg was initially disqualified for having obtained illegal assistance from her guide runner. Upon her appeal, with her final place and world record reinstated, Clegg eased away from the Chinese pair of Zhou Guohua and Liu Cuiqing to take the gold medal. The fourth finalist, double gold medalist and home favourite Terezinha Guilhermina was disqualified for illegal assistance.

Results

Heats
Qualification rule: Winners of each heat (Q) and the next four fastest (q) qualify for the semifinals.

Heat 1

Heat 2

Heat 3

Heat 4

Semifinals

Qualification rule: The winner of each heat (Q) and the next two fastest (q) qualify for the final.

Semifinal 1

Heat 2

Notes 

 Libby Clegg was initially disqualified for illegal assistance from her guide Chris Clarke, but was reinstated upon appeal, and her world record restored.

Final

References

Women's